Zhang Bangxin or by the western name Tom Zhang, is a Chinese self-made billionaire, co-founder and the chairman of the U.S. listed education services firm TAL Education Group.

References

Sources 
 Zhang Bangxin's profile on Forbes' website
 Raging Demand for Tutoring Makes Math Teacher a Billionaire, Bloomberg, 2018

Living people
Chinese billionaires
Businesspeople from Beijing
Chinese company founders
1984 births
Sichuan University alumni
China Europe International Business School alumni
Peking University alumni
Billionaires from Beijing
Educators from Beijing